The 1904 Philadelphia Athletics season involved the A's finishing fifth in the American League with a record of 81 wins and 70 losses.

Preseason

1904 Philadelphia City Series

The Athletics played eight games against the Philadelphia Phillies for the local championship in the pre-season city series. The Athletics defeated the Phillies, 5 games to 3.

The series was to have opened on April 2, 1904 at the Phillies’ Philadelphia Ball Park but was called off due to wet grounds. The game scheduled for April 9, 1904 at the Phillies’ park was canceled due to rain.

Following the 1904 series, the Athletics and Phillies had each won 10 of the twenty games played in the local championship in 1903 and 1904,

Regular season 
 May 5, 1904: Cy Young threw the first no hitter in the history of the American League's Boston franchise against the Athletics. It was also a perfect game. The Americans beat the Athletics by a score of 3–0.

Season standings

Record vs. opponents

Roster

Player stats

Batting

Starters by position 
Note: Pos = Position; G = Games played; AB = At bats; H = Hits; Avg. = Batting average; HR = Home runs; RBI = Runs batted in

Other batters 
Note: G = Games played; AB = At bats; H = Hits; Avg. = Batting average; HR = Home runs; RBI = Runs batted in

Pitching

Starting pitchers 
Note: G = Games pitched; IP = Innings pitched; W = Wins; L = Losses; ERA = Earned run average; SO = Strikeouts

Other pitchers 
Note: G = Games pitched; IP = Innings pitched; W = Wins; L = Losses; ERA = Earned run average; SO = Strikeouts

Relief pitchers 
Note: G = Games pitched; W = Wins; L = Losses; SV = Saves; ERA = Earned run average; SO = Strikeouts

Notes

References 
1904 Philadelphia Athletics team page at Baseball Reference
1904 Philadelphia Athletics team page at www.baseball-almanac.com

Oakland Athletics seasons
Philadelphia Athletics season
Oakland